The 16th European Athletics Championships were held from 7 August to 14 August 1994 in the Olympic Stadium of Helsinki, Finland.

Men's results
Complete results were published.

Track
1986 |1990 |1994 |1998 |2002 |

Field
1986 |1990 |1994 |1998 |2002 |

Women's results

Track
1986 |1990 |1994 |1998 |2002 |

Field
1986 |1990 |1994 |1998 |2002 |

Medal table

Participation
According to an unofficial count, 1125 athletes from 43 countries participated in the event, 12 athletes more than the official number of 1113 and one country less than the official number of 44 as published. The announced athlete from  did not show.

 (1)
 (1)
 (12)
 (37)
 (13)
 (2)
 (21)
 (4)
 (7)
 (23)
 (12)
 (17)
 (85)
 (78)
 (2)
 (101)
 (90)
 Greece (18)
 (27)
 (6)
 (21)
 (6)
 (73)
 (11)
 (1)
 Lithuania (11)
 (1)
 (1)
 (6)
 (23)
 (32)
 (37)
 (25)
 (22)
 (96)
 (11)
 (7)
 Spain (58)
 (45)
 (28)
 (6)
 (39)
 (8)

See also
1994 in athletics (track and field)

Notes
Differences to competition format since the 1990 European Championships:
Women's Triple Jump was added as a new event
East and West Germany competed as one team
Countries that made up the Soviet Union competed as separate teams
Countries that made up Yugoslavia competed as separate teams

References

 Athletix
 Results European Championships Athletic 1934-2010 Discus Throw, Shot Put, Long Jump by Leszek Albiniak 

 
European Athletics Championships
European Athletics Championships
European Athletics Championships 1994
1994 in European sport
International athletics competitions hosted by Finland
August 1994 sports events in Europe
1990s in Helsinki
Athletics in Helsinki